Hiyy Rohvaanulaa is a 2009 Maldivian drama film written and directed by Yoosuf Shafeeu. Produced by Mohamed Abdulla under Dhekedheke Ves Productions, the film stars Shafeeu, Niuma Mohamed, Abdulla Muaz and Nadhiya Hassan in pivotal roles.

Plot
Zeeshan (Niuma Mohamed) and Najoo (Nadhiya Hassan), two college students, visit a nearby island to do their practicum and they are being supervised by school's senior supervisor Shiyan (Yoosuf Shafeeu). He falls in love with Zeeshan and profess his love for her though she is petrified to romantically involve with anyone. After two weeks of teaching practicum, they leave the island without giving a proper reply to Shiyan's proposal. Weeks later, Zeeshan called Shiyan and agrees to marry him. After their wedding, they go to picnic to an uninhabited island where he is unexpectedly hit by a coconut while sleeping beneath a palm tree. Shiyan loses his eyesight and they moved to Zeeshan's island.

Four months later, on his friend's request, Shiyan agrees to let Vishal (Abdulla Muaz) stay at his house, who has been exiled from his island for being involved in a gang fight. It was revealed that Vishal and Zeeshan were in romantic relationship few years back and they were separated when Vishal had to leave abroad for further studies. Zeeshan, afraid of his madness, was looking for a chance to escape from his insanity. Shiyan departs for UK with his friend Ahmeen (Miraz Farooq) for a medical operation to regain his eyesight. Soon after, Shiyan's mother had to leave for Hajj, hence Zeesha invites Najoo to their house, scared of being alone with Vishal. At Shiyan's absence, Vishal threatens Zeeshan to seek divorce from Shiyan if she does not want to be exposed.

Shiyan called Zeeshan and lies that the operation was unsuccessful, planning to surprise her with the good news only after he returns. However, on his return, he was startled to witness Zeeshan and Vishal together and decided to continue his charade of blindness to discover their real relationship. Zeeshan reveals her past to Shiyan but he differed to believe her. Vishal and Zeeshan engages in a fight before Shiyan hits Vishal on his forehead with a steel rod. He beats him several times till Vishal falls unconscious. Suffering from internal bleeding, Vishal dies of the injury while Shiyan is sentenced to prison. Several years later, he was released from jail and reunites with Zeeshan and their child.

Cast 
 Yoosuf Shafeeu as Shiyan
 Niuma Mohamed as Zeeshan
 Abdulla Muaz as Vishal
 Nadhiya Hassan as Najoo
 Miraz Farooq as Ahmeen
 Arifa as Shiyan's mother
 Moosa as Zeeshan's father

Soundtrack

Accolades

References

2009 films
Maldivian drama films
Films directed by Yoosuf Shafeeu
2009 drama films
Dhivehi-language films